Camp Merriam may be:

 Camp Merriam (San Luis Obispo)
 Camp Merriam (San Francisco)
 C. Hart Merriam Base Camp Site